The following is a list of current Division III schools that have participated in the playoffs leading to the NCAA Division III Football Championship. 

The playoffs began with four teams in 1973, expanded to 8 teams to 1975, 16 teams in 1985, 28 teams in 1999, and finally 32 teams in 2005.

Current Division III members

Qualified programs
 Teams in bold participated in the 2022 postseason.
 Updated through the announcement of the 2022 postseason field on November 13, 2022.

Not yet qualified
 American Rivers Conference (3) – Loras, Luther, Nebraska Wesleyan
 American Southwest Conference (4) –  Austin, Howard Payne, Southwestern (joining SAA in 2023), Sul Ross State
 Centennial Conference (1) – Franklin & Marshall
 College Conference of Illinois and Wisconsin (1) – North Park
 Commonwealth Coast Football (3) – New England, Nichols, Salve Regina
 Eastern Collegiate Football Conference (4) – Alfred State, Castleton, Dean, Keystone
 Empire 8 (1) – SUNY Morrisville
 Heartland Collegiate Athletic Conference (2) – Bluffton, Manchester
 Independents (2) – Eastern (joining MAC in 2023), Hilbert (joining Empire 8 in 2024)
 Massachusetts State Collegiate Athletic Conference (3) – Fitchburg State, Massachusetts Maritime, Worcester State
 Michigan Intercollegiate Athletic Association (1) – Kalamazoo
 Middle Atlantic Conference (3) – Alvernia, FDU Florham, Misericordia
 Midwest Conference (6) – Beloit, Chicago, Cornell (IA), Grinnell, Knox, Ripon
 Minnesota Intercollegiate Athletic Conference (1) – Hamline
 North Coast Athletic Conference (3) – Kenyon, Oberlin, Ohio Wesleyan
 Northern Athletics Collegiate Conference (2) – Rockford, Wisconsin Lutheran
 Northwest Conference (4) – George Fox, Lewis & Clark, Pacific (OR), Puget Sound
 Ohio Athletic Conference (3) – Marietta, Muskingum, Wilmington (OH)
 Old Dominion Athletic Conference (2) – Averett, Guilford
 Presidents' Athletic Conference (4) – Geneva, Grove City, St. Vincent, Westminster (PA)
 Southern Athletic Association (1) – Sewanee
 Southern California Intercollegiate Athletic Conference (0) – None
 Upper Midwest Athletic Conference (3) – Crown, Finlandia, Westminster (MO)
 USA South Athletic Conference (5) – Belhaven, Brevard, Greensboro, Methodist, Southern Virginia

 New England Small College Athletic Conference teams do not participate in any postseason in football, they are only allowed to play in-conference games.

Former Division III members
Former NCAA Division III teams that sponsored football at D-III level and had made at least one appearance in playoffs but had left NCAA Division III.

Defunct Division III programs
Currently NCAA Division III teams that sponsored football at D-III level and had made at least one appearance in playoffs but dropped their football programs.

Notes

Program changes 
 Program has since joined Division I FCS.
 Program has since joined NCAA Division I but has dropped football.
 Program has since joined Division II.
 Program has since joined the NAIA.
 Program has since joined the NAIA but has dropped football.
 College has closed its doors.

See also
 NCAA Division III Football Championship
 List of NCAA Division III football programs
 List of NCAA Division I FBS football bowl records
 List of NCAA Division I FCS playoff appearances by team
 List of NCAA Division II Football Championship appearances by team
 List of NAIA National Football Championship Series appearances by team

References

External links
 Past winners

Lists of college football team records
Playoff Appearances